Campbell McGrath (born 1962) is an American poet. He is the author of nine full-length collections of poetry, including Seven Notebooks (Ecco Press, 2008), Shannon: A Poem of the Lewis and Clark Expedition (Ecco Press, 2009), and In the Kingdom of the Sea Monkeys (Ecco Press, 2012).

Life 

McGrath was born in Chicago, Illinois, and grew up in Washington, D.C., where he attended Sidwell Friends School; among his classmates was the poet Elizabeth Alexander. He received his B.A. from the University of Chicago in 1984 and his MFA from Columbia University's creative writing program in 1988, where he was classmates with Rick Moody and Bruce Harris Craven. He currently lives in Miami Beach, Florida, and teaches creative writing at Florida International University, where his students have included Richard Blanco, Susan Briante, Jay Snodgrass and Emma Trelles. He is married to Elizabeth Lichtenstein, whom he met while he was an undergraduate; they have two sons.

Music 

In the early 1980s, while a student at the University of Chicago, he was a member of the punk band Men From The Manly Planet.

Awards 

McGrath has been recognized by some of the most prestigious American poetry awards, including the Kingsley Tufts Poetry Award (for "Spring Comes to Chicago", his third book of poems), a Pushcart Prize, the Academy of American Poets Prize, a Ploughshares Cohen Award, a Guggenheim Fellowship, a Witter Bynner Fellowship from the Library of Congress, and a MacArthur Foundation "Genius Award." In 2011 he was named a Fellow of United States Artists. In 2017 McGrath was a finalist for the Pulitzer Prize in Poetry, along with Adrienne Rich.

Works 

While primarily known as a poet, McGrath has also written a play, "The Autobiography of Edvard Munch" (produced by Concrete Gothic Theater, Chicago, 1983); a libretto for Orlando Garcia's experimental video opera "Transcending Time" (premiered at the New Music Biennalle, Zagreb, Croatia, 2009); collaborated with the video artist John Stuart on the video/poetry piece "14 Views of Miami" (premiered at The Wolfsonian, Miami, 2008); and translated the Aristophanes play The Wasps for the Penn Greek Drama Series.

Bibliography

Poetry 
Collections and chapbooks
 
 Capitalism (Wesleyan University Press, 1990)
 American Noise (Ecco Press, 1993)
 Spring Comes to Chicago (Ecco Press, 1996)
 Road Atlas (Ecco Press, 1999)
 Mangrovia (chapbook, Short Line Editions, 2001)
 Florida Poems (Ecco Press, 2002)
 Pax Atomica (Ecco Press, 2004)
 Heart of Anthracite: New & Collected Prose Poems (Stride Press, UK)
 Seven Notebooks (Ecco Press, 2008)
 Shannon: A Poem of the Lewis and Clark Expedition (Ecco Press, 2009)
 The Custodian & Other Poems (chapbook, Floating Wolf Quarterly, 2011)
 In the Kingdom of the Sea Monkeys (Ecco Press, 2012)
 XX: Poems For The Twentieth Century (HarperCollins, 2016)
 Nouns & Verbs:New and Selected Poems (Ecco Press, 2019)
 The Radiance Archive (forthcoming, 2023)

List of poems

References

External links 
"Historian, comedian, storyteller:a conversation with poet Campbell McGrath," Lyn Millner, Florida International University Magazine, Fall 1999 issue.
Interview in MIPOesias
Bio and notes on articles in Ploughshares
Excerpt from Pax Atomica at Harper Collins
Poetry Daily interview
University of Chicago Magazine profile
 Interview in BOMB

Living people
Columbia University School of the Arts alumni
MacArthur Fellows
American male poets
Florida International University people
1962 births